This is a list of television serial dramas released by TVB in 2017, including highest-rated television dramas and award ceremonies.

Top ten drama series in ratings
The following is a list of TVB's top serial dramas in 2017 by viewership ratings. The recorded ratings include premiere week, final week, finale episode, and the average overall count of live Hong Kong viewers (in millions).

Awards

First line-up
These dramas air in Hong Kong from 8:00pm to 8:30pm, Monday to Friday on Jade.

Second line-up
These dramas air in Hong Kong from 8:30pm to 9:30pm, Monday to Friday on Jade.

Third line-up
These dramas air in Hong Kong from 9:30pm to 10:30pm, Monday to Sunday on Jade.

Starting on 19 June 2017, these dramas air in Hong Kong every Monday to Friday nights from 9:30pm to 10:30pm on Jade.

Weekend dramas
Starting on 24 June 2017, these dramas air in Hong Kong on Saturday and Sunday nights from 9:30pm to 10:30pm on Jade.

Starting on 24 September 2017, these dramas air in Hong Kong will rescheduled every Sunday nights from 8:30pm to 10:30pm followed by back-to-back with two episodes on Jade.

Notes
Phoenix Rising; Released overseas on July 9, 2007. Copyright notice: 2007.
Come with Me; Released June 5, 2016. Copyright notice: 2016.

References

External links
TVB.com Official Website 

2017
2017 in Hong Kong television